Prashanth Nair (born May 7, 1993) is an Indian-born American cricketer. He made his List A debut for the United States in the 2017–18 Regional Super50 on February 18, 2018.

References

External links
 

1993 births
Living people
American cricketers
Place of birth missing (living people)
Cricketers from Kerala